Thornapple may refer to:

Plants
 Datura species
 Crataegus species
 Solanum incanum

Places in the US
 Thornapple Township, Michigan
 Thornapple, Wisconsin, a town
 Thornapple (community), Wisconsin, an unincorporated community
 Thornapple River, Michigan
 Thornapple River (Wisconsin)
 Thornapple Trail, Michigan

Other uses
 Brutus P. Thornapple, the main character in the comic strip The Born Loser

See also 
 Little Thornapple River (disambiguation)